CBeebies is a British free-to-air public broadcast children's television channel owned and operated by the BBC. It is also the brand used for all BBC content for children aged 6 years and under. Its sister channel CBBC is aimed at older children ages 6–12. It broadcasts every day from 6:00 am to 7:00 pm, timesharing with BBC Four.

History

On November 20, 2001, the CBeebies name was officially revealed as part of the split of the already-existing CBBC block, and would be used as both a pre-school block and a digital channel.

The CBeebies channel launched on 11 February, 2002 alongside the CBBC channel, as a spinoff from the BBC's children's television strand. The first four shows to air on the channel were Teletubbies, Binka, Step Inside, and Pingu. CBeebies domestically broadcasts from 6 am to 6:58 pm, broadcasting 7 days per week, and as a result, it timeshares with fellow BBC channel BBC Four, which is on air after this channel goes off air for the day.

The station was joined in March 2007 by an audio CBeebies Radio, which broadcast for three hours each day on BBC Radio 7 until April 2011. CBeebies Radio, however, has continued as a feature on CBeebies' website since 2013, and as a station on BBC Sounds broadcasting from 6am to 10pm. A CBeebies Weekly magazine was first published in 2006.

Since March 2013, CBeebies has been carried by the British Forces Broadcasting Service, sharing a channel with BFBS Extra. CBeebies is also available in Ireland. 

On 15 March 2023, CBeebies and its sister channel CBBC rebranded their channel identities in line with a wider corporate rebranding across the BBC starting in 2021. This was CBeebies' first major rebrand, retiring the logo that the channel had used since its launch 21 years earlier. The new style featured a new logo in line with the BBC's 2021 logo, as well as a revamped appearance of the 'bug' characters that have been part of the channel's identity since launch.

International and non-English versions
BBC Studios owns and operates the international CBeebies feeds, with most of them operating on a 24-hour schedule.

The first international launch for the CBeebies channel was in India in May 2007, although the channel was withdrawn at the end of November 2012 due to "commercial considerations". The Polish CBeebies channel was launched on 2 December 2007, while feeds in Latin America, East and Southeast Asia, South Africa, and Australia were launched in 2008. In March 2011, a on demand version of the network was launched in the US and is available on Xfinity.

On 13 May 2011, CBeebies was launched as a programme block on the channel BBC Kids in Canada, available on weekdays between 9:00 am and 3:00 pm. It served a similar schedule to the main channel. The block ceased alongside its main channel on 31 December 2018, with some programmes moving to Knowledge Network.

In April 2015, BBC Worldwide signed with South Korean broadcaster KBS and Japanese broadcaster Kids Station to launch CBeebies blocks on both channels.

In April 2016, a channel for the MENA region was launched.

On 10 March 2017, CBeebies Asia was launched in Taiwan, replacing BBC Entertainment. CBeebies Asia has already launched in Hong Kong, South Korea, Myanmar, the Philippines, Mongolia, Indonesia, Singapore, Thailand, Laos, Maldives, Macau, Sri Lanka, and Malaysia. On 13 April 2017, the localized CBeebies feed for Latin America ceased operations along with BBC Earth and BBC Entertainment.

On 5 April 2018, a feed was launched on Digiturk in Turkey.

In September 2018 as part of a branding strategy, the unbranded 2-hour children's block on BBC Alba was split into CBeebies Alba and CBBC Alba, with the former airing during the first hour and the latter airing during the second hour. This block features its own presentation, presenters and shows all dubbed into Scottish Gaelic. The only presenter shared between the CBeebies Alba block and CBeebies channel is Dodge T. Dog, who appears on an occasional basis.

On 1 December 2019, the Australia feed launched in New Zealand on Sky.

In July 2020, it was relaunched in India, but with pan-Asian feed in English audio track only.

On 31 October 2020, CBeebies and CBeebies en Español ceased U.S. operations and were no longer available through any US Satellite, Cable, and Streaming provider (Dish Network, Xfinity, Sling TV, etc.) However, CBeebies can also be available as a non-Spanish channel.

On 11 January 2022, BBC Kids launched as a FAST channel on Pluto TV in the United States, which airs a majority of CBeebies and CBBC shows from the BBC Studios catalogue. A version of the channel that airs Spanish-dubbed programming titled "Niños por BBC" was launched on the same day.

Management

In the UK, CBeebies is operated by the BBC Children's and Education division and part of BBC North. The division is also responsible for CBBC and overall strategic responsibility for all of the BBC's domestic services for children rests with the Director of Children's and Education, Patricia Hildago Reina (since 2020). The direction of the domestic CBeebies channel itself rested with Kay Benbow, the last Controller of the channel commissioning all CBeebies content across BBC television, online, interactive TV, and radio. She took over from the first controller Michael Carrington in 2010. In 2017 it was announced that the CBeebies controller post would close in December 2017 and all content for the CBeebies brand would be commissioned by a new, pan BBC Children's role entitled Head of Content.   In January 2021 it was announced that the decision would be reversing and a new Head of Commissioning and Acquisitions for preschoolers (0–6) would be appointed.

Internationally, CBeebies is owned by BBC Studios, which operate the brand.

Presentation
The links between programmes on CBeebies are primarily achieved through the use of in-vision continuity, using presenters to interact with the children. In the UK, links are recorded rather than broadcast live, as is the case on sister channel CBBC. They were originally recorded from studio TC0 at BBC Television Centre in London, but moved out in 2008 to Teddington Studios, and returned briefly in 2010. From September 2011, the links have been based at the BBC's northern base at studios HQ5 and HQ6 in Dock10 studios at MediaCityUK following the move of the BBC Children's department there. International variants feature broadcast links produced either in the corresponding country or from a central base.

Logo and identities

CBeebies uses many identities throughout the day during the breaks in between shows. Most of these idents feature the mascots, named the Bugs, also known as Bugbies. The Bugbies are yellow blobs with faces, and similar to the ones used by CBBC between 2002 and 2005, with the only difference being the colour: green for CBBC and yellow for CBeebies. Most idents feature children saying the channel name twice once the logo appears except the Bedtime idents. The idents have used a moving blobby, slimy-like background or rounded shapes in any colour. Each block has its own ident, and the Bedtime Hour has a few different idents. In 2007, new idents were made for each block, replacing the old ones and the slimy moving background idents were rarely shown. New idents featuring the CBeebies House have been used from 2016 to 2023.

Programming

Presenters

Live presenters have been on CBeebies since the channel's launch. They are used to fill the gaps between the shows that air on the channel, speaking directly to the child, leading activities based on a topic from the website, showing viewers' birthday cards, and introducing the shows, well as hosting some of the shows. Many of the presenters have histories as characters in other services or on children's programmes.

International Presenters
The international variants feature different personalities per broadcast region.
 The Australian feed is the only non-UK service to feature more than one presenter, as this feed features three presenters. Tara Colegrave has presented since the channel's launch in 2008 and when the continuity links moved from the UK to Australia, she was joined by Robbie Harding and Duncan Fellows in 2011.
 The Asian feed shown in countries like Thailand, Hong Kong and Singapore has Nisha Anil as the main presenter.
 The now-defunct Latin American feed variant had Roser Cabañas as the presenter.
 The Polish channel has had Aneta Piotrowska as main presenter since its launch in 2008. On some occasions between November 2014 to 2016 Aneta appeared on the UK channel.
 The South African feed uses former UK presenter Sid Sloane. Cat Sandion also presented on this feed before becoming a presenter on the UK version.
 The CBeebies Alba block on BBC Alba uses Bard Cornark, Ben Cajee, and Carrie Macneil as the presenters.
 The Turkish feed uses the UK presenters (e.g., Cat Sandion) dubbed over with Turkish voice actors.

Stranded segments

In the UK, the CBeebies channel uses stranded segments throughout the day.

On 10 March 2003, a segment called the Bedtime Hour was aired.

From 3 April to 19 December 2004, each weekend afternoon was divided into five segments, which were presented by one of the then-current presenters, namely Chris Jarvis, Nicole Davis, Pui Fan Lee, Sidney Sloane, and Sue Monroe. Each was given a core theme (for instance Sid's segment included "building and making" programmes such as Bob the Builder, Sue's included arts and crafts theme programmes and so on). The five segments aired from 1:00 pm until 6:00 pm; the segmentation was later dispensed in December 2004, although the presenters still wore their respective colours for several months afterwards. They also cropped up in props used in links, such as coloured plates.

The five coloured room sections ran from 1:00 pm to 6:00 pm and included:
 Pui's Exploring Hour (Red Room), with programmes such as Come Outside, Teletubbies Everywhere, Tots TV, Boo!,  Bits and Bobs and Fab Lab
 Sid's Fix-It Hour (Green Room), with programmes such as Bob the Builder, Fireman Sam, Little Robots, and Postman Pat
 Chris's Singalong Hour (Blue Room), with programmes such as  Tweenies, Zingalong and Balamory
 Sue's Make and Do Hour (Pink Room), with programmes such as SMarteenies, Big Cook, Little Cook, Pingu and Tikkabilla
 Nicole's Furry Friends Hour (Orange Room), with programmes such as Clifford the Big Red Dog, Binka,  The Koala Brothers, Angelmouse,  Barnaby Bear and The Magic Key

A new strand entitled the Carrot Club was introduced in 2003, which had a female voiceover presenting where we are shown to toddlers running around and playing with toys. A new strand entitled Pick and Play was shown for the first time in June 2004, in which viewers contacted CBeebies via the website and other means to suggest programmes they would like to see. Also, in September 2005, a new strand called Bear and Butterfly launched, showing on weekend mornings. Presented by a cartoon bear (voiced by Chris Jarvis) and butterfly (voiced by Sue Monroe), and with an occasional appearance from a caterpillar, the characters interacted in an animated environment. They also showed pictures that had been sent in on their Message Tree.

New strands were introduced on 3 April 2006; Get Set Go from 7.00am (Currently 6.00am) to 9.00am, Explorers from 9:00 am to 10:00 am and 1:00 pm to 2:00 pm, Busy Beebies from 10:00 am to 11:45 am and 2:00 pm to 3:45 pm, Story Corner from 11:45 am to 12:00 pm and 3:45 pm to 4:00 pm, and Little Lunchers from 12:00 pm to 1:00 pm. The Bedtime Hour was retained.

On 19 March 2007, these segments were dropped (apart from Get Set Go and Bedtime Hour) and modified to denote the time of day and the levels of activity, including:
 Get Set Go – Early morning schedule between 6:00am (Originally 7.00am until March 18, 2007) and 9:00am; and given longer hours.  Includes programmes such as Baby Jake, Raa Raa the Noisy Lion, Postman Pat, Bing,  Hey Duggee, Tinpo, Monty the Dog, Biggleton, Justin's House, Octonauts, Love Monster, Bluey, Tish Tash, Twirlywoos, Bitz & Bob, Numberblocks, Alphablocks, and Go Jetters.
 Discover and Do – Late morning and early afternoon, weekdays between 9:00 am and 3:00 pm. The strand is aimed at young children who would not be attending school or pre-school. It often contains programmes that give a learning opportunity to viewers, such as Something Special, Teletubbies, B.O.T. And the Beasties, Let's Play, Andy's Baby Animals, Topsy and Tim,    Alphablocks, Twirlywoos, Numberblocks and Yakka Dee. The hour between 12:00 pm and 1:00 pm is branded as Lunch Time and features shows such as My World Kitchen, Molly and Mack & Patchwork Pals.
 Big Fun Time – Late afternoon weekdays between 3:00pm and 5:45pm. This strand is notable for aiming at the higher end of its remit, airing programming for children who have recently returned from school. Programmes include ZingZillas,  The Furchester Hotel, Swashbuckle,  Do You Know?, Andy's Safari Adventures, Apple Tree House, Grace's Amazing Machines,Bitz & Bob, Waffle the Wonder Dog & Gigglebiz.
 Bedtime – The final hour and 15 minutes of CBeebies broadcasting between 5:45 pm and 7:00 pm. The original stranded section of the channel (and the only to still air to this day), Bedtime helps to prepare children for bed and features calm-natured programming. Programmes include Clangers,  Moon and Me, Charlie and Lola, Tee and Mo, Sarah & Duck, Waybuloo and In the Night Garden.... Story-telling is often told during the programmes. The final programme is always the Bedtime Stories slot (see below) and is followed by a final song, "The Time Has Come to Say Goodnight", before the channel closes for the day and BBC Four starts up. CBeebies Bedtime was renamed from Bedtime Hour as of 4 February 2019.

When these segments were initially introduced, each segment featured its own presenting team and set, with Chris Jarvis and Pui Fan Lee (Andy Day and Sid Sloane after they left in 2009 till 6th June 2010) presenting Discover and Do in the CBeebies "living room"; Lunch Time in the "kitchen"; Bedtime Hour in the "bedroom"; Sidney Sloane (plus Andy Day when he joined the channel later in 2007) presenting Get, Set, Go! in the "living room" and Big Fun Time in the "garage". However, since moving production to Manchester this is no longer the case, with the exception of Bedtime Hour which is presented from the area nearest the house's bed.

Storytimes
While the lunchtime story is usually read by one of the regular presenters, the final show of each day, the Bedtime Story (known as Stòiridh in Scottish Gaelic and airing on BBC Alba) is read by a guest storyteller, including well known actors, comedians, singers/musicians, and past presenters of BBC children's television.

CBeebies HD

The channel launched on 10 December 2013, though was rolled-out nationwide up to June 2014 (as did BBC News HD, CBBC HD and BBC Four HD). The channel broadcasts on a commercially operated HD multiplex on Freeview, with limited geographic coverage compared with other multiplexes, and shares its stream with BBC Four HD as they air at different times. Prior to launch, the majority of CBeebies' HD output was broadcast on BBC HD before its closure on 26 March 2013.

Other ventures

CBeebies website

The CBeebies website coincided with the launch of the UK channel in February 2002 and showcases a child friendly site with activities themed to all CBeebies programmes, past and present, with games, songs and print-outs featuring for nearly all shows. The UK version also features links to CBeebies iPlayer, a child friendly version of the BBC iPlayer featuring CBeebies programmes only, to CBeebies radio player and a dedicated micro site containing advice for raising children and toddlers called CBeebies Grown-ups, which was relaunched in 2011.

The international channels and associated websites are run by BBC Studios. As a result, not all of them are the same and some channels have less extensive websites than other services. CBeebies channels in Asia, Australia, Poland, South Africa and the USA all have their own international variant.

VHS and DVD releases
BBC Video (and later 2Entertain) have released several VHS/DVD compilations featuring shows airing on CBeebies at the time. As of 2014, Abbey Home Media releases the compilations.

Album releases
Five CBeebies-branded CDs have been released, 'CBeebies: The Official Album' in 2002, 'My CBeebies Album' in 2006, 'My CBeebies Album (Christmas Edition)' in 2007, 'CBeebies: Song Time' in 2010, and 'CBeebies: The Album' in 2012.

CBeebies Land
CBeebies Land opened in May 2014. Designed as a retheme of the previous Storybook Land and Old McDonald's Farmyard areas of the Alton Towers Resort theme park, it contains a range of themed rides, attractions and live entertainment based around various popular CBeebies programmes. It offers various indoor and outdoor activities aimed at making an immersive and interactive world for children and young families.

The site based within Alton Towers Resort in Staffordshire includes some of the more popular characters from the original channel for guests to meet. Described as a 'fun environment for pre-schoolers to play and learn' by critics. Before CBeebies Land, Alton Towers did not have enough rides suitable for young children and since opening CBeebies Land now makes visiting Alton Towers exciting for younger children.

At the start of the year, the theme park sporadically released information on the characters involved in the development via their Facebook and Twitter accounts.
 On 4 January, Mr Tumble was the first character confirmed – featuring in the Something Special Sensory Garden and 5 January saw Mr. Bloom confirmed as featuring in the development in the form of Mr Bloom's Allotments.
 On 6 January, the park revealed an In the Night Garden... redesign of their existing Riverbank Eyespy. On the re-themed attraction, In the Night Garden Magical Boat Ride, guests will be able to drift around the 'enchanted dreamworld'; an area that will use colours, sights and sounds to bring picture books to life. Iggle Piggle, Makka Pakka and Upsy Daisy will all be on the Night Garden Island to help children appreciate the values of diversity, and enjoy the wonder in the world around them.

Stephen Gould, commercial director at DHX Media who licence In the Night Garden... commented, "We are extremely excited to be working in partnership with BBC Worldwide, Merlin Entertainments and Alton Towers Resort on this new venture. In The Night Garden is the ideal draw brand to provide a fun, nurturing, inspiring and immersive environment for CBeebies Land and its visitors."

The fourth reveal on 7 January was that of Nina and the Neurons Based around the popular show which sees Nina, with the help of her animated sense Neurons, explain how and why the world around us works as it does. Nina's Science Lab will bring together the Neurons to show how they control your five senses. In a hands-on scientific attraction, children will learn how their bodies work and what they do.

The latest additions to CBeebies Land was in Spring 2022. In December 2021, it was confirmed that Alton Towers are adding three new attractions to CBeebies Land, there was Hey Duggee Big Adventure Badge which has replaced Tree Fu Tom Training Camp. Also there was Andy's Adventures Dinosaur Dig which replaced Mr Bloom's Alloment. Finally there was: JoJo and GranGran at Home which replaced Charlie and Lola's Moonsquirters & Green drops.

Awards
The UK channel and the programmes it has broadcast have received a number of awards throughout the years. In 2002, the CBeebies Interactive TV Services was nominated in the Best Interactive Service category and CBeebies Online was nominated in the same category in 2005 at the BAFTA Children's Awards. The channel was awarded Best Children's Channel and Highly Commended at the Broadcast Digital Channel Awards 2006, however only achieved a nomination in 2007 and 2008. The channel was also named Children's Channel of the Year at the BAFTA Children's awards in 2006, 2010, 2011, 2013, 2016, 2018 and 2019. and was nominated for Channel of the Year in 2008

The CBeebies UK website was nominated Best Interactive Site at the 2007 BAFTA Children's awards, and the brand as a whole also won the Best Design and Innovation award by the Royal Television Society, whose awarding panel said "Its website is an integral part of the brand, with its TV production and online teams working together to create innovative game play and immersive web experiences."

Notes

References

External links
 
 CBeebies Official YouTube Channel
 
 CBeebies Grown Ups

 
Preschool education television networks
2002 establishments in the United Kingdom
BBC television channels in the United Kingdom
Children's television channels in the United Kingdom
Commercial-free television networks
Mass media in Salford
Organisations based in Salford
Television channels and stations established in 2002
Television channels in the United Kingdom
Mass media in the United Kingdom
International BBC television channels